Giampietrino, probably  Giovanni Pietro Rizzoli (active 1495–1549), was a north Italian painter of the Lombard school and Leonardo's circle, succinctly characterized by S. J. Freedberg as an "exploiter of Leonardo's repertory."

Biography

Giampietrino was a productive painter of large altarpieces, Madonnas, holy women in half figure, and mythological women. For a long time, the true identity of the artist was unknown; he was only known as a so-called "Giampietrino" whose name appeared in lists of the members of Leonardo's studio. In 1929, Wilhelm Suida suggested that he could perhaps be Giovanni Battista Belmonte, since a Madonna signed with this name and dated 1509 had been associated stylistically with Giampietrino. Since then, this assumption is considered outdated, and Giampietrino is identified predominantly with Giovanni Pietro Rizzoli, who is known through documents.

Giampietrino has been regarded as a talented painter who contributed substantially to the distribution of the late style of Leonardo da Vinci. He copied many works by Leonardo, as well as leaving behind numerous capable original compositions of his own. Many of his works are preserved in multiple versions of the same subject.

Selected works

 Amsterdam, Rijksmuseum
 Mary with the Child. (attributed)
 Berlin, Gemäldegalerie
 St. Mary Magdalene in the prayer.
 St. Catharine of Alexandria
 Weeping Christ with a founder.
 The Birth Christ. (attributed)
 Budapest, Hungary Museum of Fine Arts
 Madonna and Child with Saints Jerome and Michael (1535)
 Burgos, Cathedral
 Mary Magdalene.
 Cambridge (Massachusetts), Fogg Art Museum, Harvard University Art Museum
 The Holy Family.
 Chantilly, Musée Condé 
 Head of a Woman. (Fragment)
Detroit, Detroit Institute of Arts 
Salvator Mundi
 Gazzada Schianno, Museo Cagnola 
 The Holy Family.
 Gloucester, Highnam Court 
 Mary with the Child (Madonna with the Lily). (attributed)
 Isola Bella, Collezione Borromeo 
 Dido.
 Sophronia.
 Kassel, Old Master Picture Gallery
 Leda and her Children.
 Lewisburg, Bucknell University Art Gallery
 Cleopatra. around 1525
 London, Courtauld institutes Galleries 
 Mary with the Child and the St. Jerome. (attributed)
 Mary with the Child (Madonna with the Lily). (attributed)
 London, National Gallery
 Christ, Carrying the Cross. around 1510 - 1530
 Salome. around 1510 - 1530
 London, Private Collections
 Salome.
 Ecce Homo.
 London, Royal Academy 
 The Holy Communion.
 The Last Supper, after Leonardo da Vinci
 Madison (Wisconsin), Chazen Museum of Art, University of Wisconsin–Madison
 Lucrezia Romana. around 1525
 Milan, Collezione Brivio Sforza 
 The Nymph Hegeria.
 Milan, Collezione Nembrini 
 Venus and Cupid.
 Milan, Private collection
 Christ with the Crown of Thorns.
 Milan, Collezione Rob Smeets 
 Mary with the Child (Madonna with the Cherries).
 Milan, Museo Bagatti Valsecchi 
 Polyptych: Madonna Enthroned with Saints, Christ the Redeemer, and Christ as Salvator Mundi.
 Milan, Pinacoteca Ambrosiana 
 Mary with the Child.
 The Holy Family with St. Roch
 St. John the Evangelist.
 Ecce homo.
 Milan, Pinacoteca del Castello Sforzesco 
 St. Mary Magdalene
 Milan, Pinacoteca di Brera 
 St. Mary Magdalene Reading.
 Paying for Mary Magdalene.
 Mary with the Child and the Lamb. (unfinished)
 Mary with the Child.
 Milan, Sant' Alessandro 
 Christ at the Scourge Column.
 Morimondo, Abbazia di Santa Maria di Morimondo 
 Christ, Sitting at the Grave.
 Nancy, Musée des Beaux-Arts
 Christ as Salvator Mundi.
 Neapel, Museo Nazionale di Capodimonti 
 St. Mary Magdalene in Prayer.
 Mary with the child and Sts. John the Baptist and Jerome.
 New York, Metropolitan Museum of Art
 Diana the Huntress.
 Oberlin, Allen Memorial Art Museum, Oberlin College
 Cleopatra. around 1520 - 1540 (attributed)
 Ospedaletto Lodigiano, parish church 
 Mary with the Child and the Sts. Jerome and John the Baptist.
 Paris, Musée National du Louvre
 The Death of Cleopatra by an Asp.
 Pavia, Curia Vescovile 
 Mary with the Child and Sts. Jerome and John the Baptist.
 Pavia Civic Museums
 Magdalene
 Ponce, Museo di Arte de Ponce 
 St. John the Baptist. around 1530
 Ponte Capriasca, Sant' Ambrogio 
 Mary with the Child of Loretto with Sts. John the Baptist and Katharina of Alexandria.
 Portland, Oregon Portland Art Museum
 St. Mary Magdalene. c. 1521; holding jar of oil
 Prague, Sternbersky Palace
 St. Mary Magdalene
 Rome, Galleria Borghese 
 Mary with the Child.
Rouen, Musée des Beaux Arts
 Penitent St. Jerome
 Seattle, Seattle Art museum 
 Mary with the Child and St. John the Baptist. around 1510 - 1515
 San Francisco, Fine Arts museum 
 St. Catherine of Alexandria.
 St. Petersburg, Hermitage Museum
 Mary with Child. around 1520 - 1530
 Christ with the Symbol of the Holy Trinity
 Praying St. Mary Magdalene.
 St. John the Evangelist. (attributed)
 São Paulo, Museu de Arte
 The Virgin Nursing the Child with St. John the Baptist in Adoration. around 1500 - 1520
 Turin, Galleria Sabauda
 Christ, Carrying the Cross.
 Waco, Texas, Baylor University, Armstrong-Browning Library, Kress Collection
 Christ, the Man of Sorrows. around 1540
 Washington, Howard University Gallery of Art
 St. Mary Magdalene. around 1530 (attributed)

Notes

References

 William Suida: Leonardo and His Circle, (Munich: Bruckmann) 1929.
 The Legacy of Leonardo, (Milan: Skira Editore S.p.A.), 1998.

External links
Leonardo da Vinci: anatomical drawings from the Royal Library, Windsor Castle, exhibition catalog fully online as PDF from The Metropolitan Museum of Art, which contains material on Giampietrino (see index)

15th-century Italian painters
Italian male painters
16th-century Italian painters
Italian Renaissance painters
1495 births
1549 deaths
Pupils and followers of Leonardo da Vinci